Lexus Link, launched October, 2000, is a subscription-based safety and security service from Lexus. It has been offered as a factory-installed option, available on certain Lexus models (LX, GX, LS, and GS), offering call-center-based telematics services to owners with equipped vehicles in the United States and Canada. The second-generation Lexus Link system utilizes a dedicated cellular phone (dual-mode CDMA/analog), Global Positioning Satellite (GPS) technology and 24-hour live-operator support. In 2009, an expanded system with added functionality,  Lexus Enform with Safety Connect, succeeded Lexus Link.

History
The first generation Lexus Link system was a private-labeled brand of OnStar, operating on Verizon Wireless’ cellular network, available as a factory-installed option on the following vehicles in Model Years 2001-04: LS 430 ('01-'04), GX 470 ('03-'04), LX 470 ('03-'04), SC 430 ('03-'04) and RX 330 ('04). The first generation system was analog-only and is no longer operational.

The second generation Lexus Link system was launched October 2005 as a private-label brand of OEM Telematics Services, available as a factory-installed option on MY 2006 and later LX, GX (vehicles produced October 1, 2005 and later) and MY 2007 and later  LX, GX, LS, GS vehicles and uses dual-mode (digital/analog) technology operating on Verizon Wireless’ cellular network.

The differences between the first and second generation systems are as follows:

Services
Lexus Link is offered in the continental U.S and Alaska. Different service packages are offered to customers. While safety and security are the main purpose of the Lexus Link system, further services include driving directions, information assistance, traffic, weather, stock quotes, or Personal Calling. Depending on service package, potential services include:

Analog sunset
Due to the growth and acceptance of digital cellular systems, many cellular carriers have abandoned analog coverage in favor of digital service. The Federal Communications Commission (FCC) ruled that cellular telephone companies operating in the United States are no longer required to provide analog service after February 2008. As a result, beginning January 1, 2008, Lexus Link service in the U.S. and Canada will only be available through vehicles equipped with dual-mode (analog/digital) equipment.

Since the first-generation Lexus Link system uses analog cellular technology and cannot be modified to digital operation, Lexus offered to disable the Lexus Link system and remove the button panel from the vehicle at no cost for owners of model year 2001–2004 vehicles.

See also
Advanced Automatic Collision Notification
BMW Assist
Dashtop mobile
GPS tracking
LoJack
MVEDR
OnStar
G-Book

References

External links
Lexus Link

Lexus
Global Positioning System
Vehicle telematics
Vehicle safety technologies
Crime prevention
Automotive technology tradenames